Disment of Soul is the first demo by Finnish metal band Amorphis. It was released as a cassette tape on 4 January 1991.

Track listing

Credits

Amorphis 
Tomi Koivusaari – vocals, rhythm guitar
Esa Holopainen – lead guitar
Olli-Pekka Laine – bass guitar
Jan Rechberger – drums

Additional personnel 
Thorncross (Christophe Moyen) – artwork
Timo Tolkki – recording

Demo albums
Amorphis albums
1991 albums